Narsingh Gurung was Nepalese Kaji under King Rana Bahadur Shah. He is best known for his mission to Imperial China.

In 1789, Gurung was sent to China to discuss the terms of the Treaty of Betrawati (Sino-Nepalese War).

In 1795, Gurung was awarded red Tog (crown) of the second rank and plume of peacock feathers by the Chinese emperor.

Gurung was killed in the Bhandarkhal massacre in April 1806 which was led by future Mukhtiyar (equivalent to prime minister) Bhimsen Thapa.

References 

1806 deaths
Nepalese military personnel
People from Syangja District
People of the Nepalese unification
Gurung people